Bill Coen (born May 3, 1961) is an American college basketball coach and the current head men's basketball coach at the Northeastern University.  He was previously an assistant coach under Al Skinner at Boston College and Rhode Island. Under his coaching, the Huskies have won two CAA tournament championships and played in the NCAA Division I men's basketball tournament two times.

Head coaching record

References

External links
 Northeastern profile

1961 births
Living people
American men's basketball coaches
American men's basketball players
Boston College Eagles men's basketball coaches
College men's basketball head coaches in the United States
Hamilton Continentals men's basketball coaches
Hamilton Continentals men's basketball players
Northeastern Huskies men's basketball coaches
Place of birth missing (living people)
Rhode Island Rams men's basketball coaches